OutQ was a news, talk and entertainment channel on Sirius XM Radio, targeted for gay, lesbian, bisexual and transgender audiences. The channel was available to Sirius and XM subscribers in both the United States and Canada.

Personalities associated with the channel included Frank DeCaro, Doria Biddle, Larry Flick, Lance Bass, Derek Hartley, and Romaine Patterson. Tim Curran served as the channel's news director, with Xorje Olivares as the lead anchor. OutQ News changed its schedule on August 4, 2013, leaving behind its top-of-the-hour format in favor of a daily news review aired at 6pm EST.

On November 20, 2006, station founder and show host John McMullen was relieved of his duties.

SiriusXM closed down OutQ on February 13, 2016.

References

External links
 OutQ News blog
 SIRIUS XM Radio to Receive Special Recognition GLAAD Award for 'The Laramie Project, 10 Years Later - The Lasting Legacy of Matthew Shepard'

Sirius Satellite Radio channels
Digital-only radio stations
LGBT-related radio stations
LGBT-related mass media in the United States
Radio stations established in 2003
Radio stations disestablished in 2016
2000s LGBT-related mass media
2010s LGBT-related mass media
Defunct radio stations in the United States